Lithilaria is a genus of moths of the family Noctuidae. The genus was erected by Rudolph Rosenstock in 1885.

Species
Lithilaria anomozancla (Turner, 1944) Queensland
Lithilaria cautiperas (Hampson, 1912) Sri Lanka
Lithilaria maculapex (Hampson, 1891) India
Lithilaria melanostrotum (Turner, 1906) Australia
Lithilaria ossicolor Rosenstock, 1885 Australia
Lithilaria proestans (T. P. Lucas, 1895) Australia, New Zealand
Lithilaria punctilinea (Wileman, 1915) Taiwan

References

Hypeninae